Lunatic Soul II is the second solo album by Riverside vocalist and bass guitarist Mariusz Duda released under the name Lunatic Soul.

Track listing
All songs written by Mariusz Duda, except where noted.

Personnel
Mariusz Duda – vocals, bass, acoustic guitar, percussion
Maciej Szelenbaum - piano, keyboards
Wawrzyniec Dramowicz - drums, percussion

Reception

Charts

References

2010 albums
Mystic Production albums
Kscope albums